Anatoliko is a village of the Kozani municipality. Before the 2011 local government reform it was part of the municipality of Ellispontos. Administratively Anatoliko is a part of the community of Kapnochori. The 2011 census recorded 28 inhabitants in the village.

References

Populated places in Kozani (regional unit)